The Qualla Boundary or The Qualla is territory held as a land trust by the United States government for the federally recognized Eastern Band of Cherokee Indians, who reside in western North Carolina. The area is part of the large historic Cherokee territory in the Southeast, which extended into eastern Tennessee, western South Carolina, northern Georgia and Alabama. Currently, the largest contiguous portion of the Qualla lies in Haywood, Swain, and Jackson counties and is centered on the community of Cherokee, which serves as the tribal capital of the Eastern Band of Cherokee Indians.  Smaller, discontiguous parcels also lie in Graham and Cherokee counties, near the communities of Snowbird and Murphy respectively.

The tribe purchased this land in the 1870s, and it was subsequently placed under federal protective trust; it is not a reservation created by the government. Individuals can buy, own, and sell the land, provided they are enrolled members of the Tribe of the Eastern Band of the Cherokee Indians.

Etymology
Qualla comes from the Cherokee word  ('old woman'), because an old Cherokee woman, Polly, lived in the area.

Location

The main part of the Qualla Boundary lies in eastern Swain and northern Jackson counties (just south of Great Smoky Mountains National Park). A small portion of the main trust lands extends eastward into Haywood County. The trust lands include many smaller non-contiguous sections to the southwest in Marble, Hiwassee, and Hanging Dog areas of Cherokee County, North Carolina, and the Snowbird community in Graham County, North Carolina. The total land area of these regions is 213.934 km² (82.6 sq mi), with a 2000 census resident population of 8,092 people.

History

The Cherokee and their ancestors have long occupied this area, having migrated here centuries before Europeans arrived. During their colonial expansion west, European settlers sometimes came into conflict with the Cherokee, whose territory extended into present-day Tennessee and northern Georgia. After the late eighteenth century and warfare with American settlers during and after the Revolutionary War, many of the Cherokee moved further south along the Tennessee River, into Georgia and westward into Alabama, establishing at least eleven new towns .

The Cherokee were forcibly removed in the late 1830s from much of this area, especially the Black Belt in Georgia and Alabama, under federal authority as authorized by Congress in the 1830 Indian Removal Act. They were relocated to Indian Territory west of the Mississippi River, in what is the present-day state of Oklahoma.

During the winter of 1838 and early the spring of 1839, the U.S. Federal Government relocated approximately 11,000 Cherokee from their homeland in North Carolina, in what is known as the Trail of Tears. Some of the Cherokee were able to evade the initial removal and hide in the Great Smoky Mountains, some were free to stay on their lands due to earlier treaties, but the majority of the Cherokee people were removed from the land. This was when the main struggle for land at what became the Qualla Boundary began.

The Qualla Boundary was first surveyed in 1876 by M. S. Temple under the auspices of the United States Land Office. These pieces were embodied in a map published as the Map of the Qualla Indian reserve.

The Qualla Boundary is a land trust supervised by the United States Bureau of Indian Affairs. The land is a fragment of the extensive historical homeland of the Cherokee in the region, and was considered part of the Cherokee Nation during the nineteenth century, prior to certain treaties and Indian Removal in the 1830s. William Holland Thomas had lived and worked among the Cherokee people for a good portion of his life. He had a knowledge of their traditions and language, and was close friends with some members of the tribe.  The Cherokee valued and respected Thomas; he had studied law and was adopted into the tribe and named as successor by its hereditary chief. He is the only European American to have served as chief in their history. 

Thomas purchased lands around the Oconaluftee River for the tribe, the total area adding up to around 50,000 acres; this land is still a large part of what makes up the Boundary today. The Cherokee organized and formed a corporation in 1870 to be able to purchase and hold additional lands. The Cherokee who gained the ability to live in North Carolina were considered to be an independent band from the Cherokee Nation living in Oklahoma.

A United States Department of Interior sign, entitled "Qualla Indian Reservation", reads:

Government and Law

The tribal community functions like most municipalities, operating schools, law enforcement, and rescue services, in addition to their own hospital and gaming casino, known as Harrah's Cherokee. They have opened a second location of the casino on their land in Murphy, North Carolina. The Tribe has operated a court system since 1987.

Tribal police have exclusive police jurisdiction on Indian lands. The FBI and other federal agencies have jurisdiction to handle certain major federal criminal offenses. NC State Troopers, motor vehicle inspectors, wildlife officers, state alcohol agents, SBI agents, and other state peace officers assigned to counties that overlap with the Qualla Boundary can be called to assist tribal law enforcement officers, and can be commissioned as "special officers" of the Department of Interior to assist in federal investigations. Non-tribal members charged with a crime in Qualla Boundary are referred to local county courts.

Administrative divisions 
The Qualla Boundary is divided into seven communities, which are similar to townships.

There are no municipalities, instead each community elects two representatives to the EBCI tribal council; except for Cherokee County and Snowbird, which share two representatives to the EBCI tribal council. Cherokee, a census-designated place (CDP), overlaps most of Painttown and Yellowhill, with a small portion also in Wolftown.

Education

From 1890 to 1954, the U.S. Indian Service  (later renamed the Bureau of Indian Affairs) operated the Cherokee Boarding Schools in Cherokee. It was replaced with elementary day schools in Big Cove, Soco, Birdtown, and Snowbird. In 1962, all elementary day schools were consolidated into Central Elementary School in Cherokee. In 1975, Cherokee High School was opened with grades seven through twelve. On August 1, 1990, Cherokee Central Schools became a tribally operated school district, with students assigned from Big Cove, Birdtown, Painttown, Wolftown, and Yellowhill communities. In 1996, the school district established the Kituwah curriculum for kindergarten through sixth grade, which incorporates the Cherokee language; prior to this, the Cherokee language was not permitted when it was operated under the Bureau of Indian Affairs.

In 2004, the EBCI established the New Kituwah Academy, a private bilingual Cherokee- and English-language immersion school for Cherokee students in kindergarten through sixth grade, located in the Yellowhill community.

Western Carolina University Cherokee Center 

Established in 1975, in cooperation with the EBCI, it is the headquarters for all outreach and involvement between Western Carolina University with residents in the Qualla Boundary and outside surrounding communities. Providing services including application process, transcript request, scholarships, internships placement, high school recruitment, as well as college level courses. The Cherokee Center is led by a Director and supported by an advisory board composed of representatives from the EBCI and Western Carolina University.

Representation in media
In the mid-1950s, much of Disney's five-part television series, Davy Crockett (starring Fess Parker), was filmed here.

See also
 Cherokee Preservation Foundation
 Eastern Band of Cherokee Indians
 Harrah's Cherokee

References

Further reading
"Eastern Cherokee Reservation, North Carolina", United States Census Bureau
"Indians, Eastern Band of Cherokees of North Carolina," by Thomas Donaldson, 1892, 11th Census of the United States, Robert P. Porter, Superintendent, US Printing Office, Washington, D.C. Published online at Eastern Band of Cherokees of North Carolina, Access Genealogy. Retrieved on 2009-01-08

External links

Visit Cherokee, NC
Eastern Band of Cherokee

Geography of North Carolina
Blue Ridge National Heritage Area
American Indian reservations in North Carolina
Cherokee-speaking countries and territories
Eastern Band of Cherokee Indians